Dulcy Singer is an American television producer, who served as executive producer for Sesame Street from 1980–1993, previously she had worked on that series on a television special called Christmas Eve on Sesame Street in 1978. For many years, in the closing credits sequence of Sesame Street, her name usually appeared first.

Education 
She received her B.A. in English literature from Mount Holyoke College in 1955.

Awards
Winner:
 1979: Emmy Award (with Jon Stone) for Outstanding Children's Program, Christmas Eve on Sesame Street

Nominations:
 1984: Emmy Award for Outstanding Children's Program, Don't Eat the Pictures: Sesame Street at the Metropolitan Museum of Art.

See also
 Crew of Sesame Street

References

External links
 
 Television Top 100: The 1960s: Sesame Street: Kermit Sings "Bein' Green"
 Los Angeles Times Interview

Daytime Emmy Award winners
Mount Holyoke College alumni
Living people
Year of birth missing (living people)